Wadi Watir is a narrow wadi and gorge in the Sinai.

Date palms line the wadi at places, and it empties into the Gulf of Aqaba  near Nuweiba.

References

Watir
Canyons and gorges of Asia
Watir